Sutherland Sound (officially Te Hāpua / Sutherland Sound) is a fiord of the South Island of New Zealand. It is the smallest of the fiords that make up the coast of Fiordland, and the only one with limited sea access (owing to a large sandbar at the entrance to its narrower section). The fiord is composed of two main sections - a large bay opening into the sea, and a more traditional fiord as the inner section.

{ "type": "ExternalData", "service": "geoshape", "ids": "Q19309697", "properties": { "fill": "#0050d0"}}

History and naming
The fiord was named Sutherland Sound after explorer Donald Sutherland who visited the fiord in 1883. In October 2019, the name of the fiord was officially changed to Te Hāpua / Sutherland Sound.

References

Sounds of Fiordland